The Oaxacan broad-clawed shrew (Cryptotis peregrina) is a species of mammal in the family Soricidae. It is found in Oaxaca in Mexico.

References

Cryptotis
Mammals of Mexico
Mammals of Central America